Ijaz Khan is a Pakistani politician who had been a member of the Provincial Assembly of the Punjab from August 2018 till January 2023. Previously he was member of the Punjab Assembly from May 2013 to May 2018.

Early life and education 
He was born on 10 April 1967 in Rawalpindi.

He graduated from University of the Punjab in 1990 with a Bachelor of Arts degree.

Political career

He was elected to the Provincial Assembly of the Punjab as a candidate of Pakistan Tehreek-e-Insaf (PTI) from Constituency PP-12 (Rawalpindi-XII) in 2013 Pakistani general election.

He was re-elected to Provincial Assembly of the Punjab as a candidate of PTI from Constituency PP-18 (Rawalpindi-XIII) in 2018 Pakistani general election.

References

Living people
Punjab MPAs 2013–2018
1967 births
Pakistan Tehreek-e-Insaf MPAs (Punjab)
Punjab MPAs 2018–2023